Disteniini is a tribe of Disteniid beetle.

Genera

External links

Chrysomeloidea
Beetle tribes